Ali Oz (born 28 May 1995) is a French rugby union player. His position is prop and he currently plays for Racing 92 in the Top 14.

In November 2020 he was called up to the France national team by Fabien Galthié as part of the squad for the Autumn Nations Cup.

References

External links
Racing 92 profile

1995 births
Living people
People from Voiron
French rugby union players
Racing 92 players
Rugby union props
Sportspeople from Isère
FC Grenoble players